Harbor Lights was the fourth album by Bruce Hornsby and was released by RCA Records in 1993. It was the first album credited solely to Hornsby, without his previous backing band, the Range.

The record showcased Hornsby in a more jazz-oriented setting and featured an all-star lineup, including Pat Metheny, Branford Marsalis, Jerry Garcia, Phil Collins and Bonnie Raitt. Unlike earlier albums, Harbor Lights allowed more space for Hornsby's and guest-players' "extended instrumental" solos to "flow naturally" out of the songs.  The tone was set by the opening title track, which after 50 seconds of expansive solo piano lurches into an up-tempo jazz number, ending with Metheny's guitar runs.  The album closes in a similar fashion with "Pastures of Plenty", this time with an extended guitar solo from Garcia intertwined with Hornsby's piano.  Hornsby also quotes the main musical phrase from the Grateful Dead's "Dark Star" as the jazz head to his song about tensions surrounding a biracial relationship, "Talk of the Town".

The mid-tempo "Fields of Gray", written for Hornsby's recently born twin sons, received some modest radio airplay, peaking at #69 on the Billboard Hot 100. Harbor Lights was well received by critics and fans, who praised it for its "cooler, jazzier sound" and its "affinity for sincere portraits of American life, love, and heartache."

The album cover uses Edward Hopper's 1951 painting Rooms By the Sea.

Track listing
All music and lyrics by Bruce Hornsby, except where noted.

Personnel (on all tracks) 
 Bruce Hornsby – vocals, grand piano, organ, accordion, synthesizers
 Jimmy Haslip – bass
 John Molo – drums

Additional personnel, by track

Harbor Lights
 Pat Metheny – guitar solo, sitar
 John Bigham – rhythm guitar
 Laura Creamer-Dunville – backing vocals
 Jean McClain – backing vocals
 Dave Duncan – MIDI man
 Jeff Lorber – loops

Talk of the Town
 Branford Marsalis – soprano saxophone
 Jeff Lorber – programming
 Will Ross – rhythm guitar
 Pat Metheny – guitar
 Phil Collins – bongos

Long Tall Cool One
 Branford Marsalis – soprano saxophone
 Phil Collins – backing vocals

China Doll
 Pat Metheny – guitar solo
 Phil Collins – backing vocals
 Tony Berg – guitar chords
 Wayne Pooley – guitar chords

Fields of Gray
 Phil Collins – tambourine, backing vocals
 John McLaughlin Williams – violin
 Laura Roelofs Park – violin
 Beverly K. Baker – viola
 William Conita – cello
 Lamont Coward – percussion

Rainbow's Cadillac
 John Bigham – lead and rhythm guitars
 Bonnie Raitt – backing vocals
 Laura Creamer-Dunville – backing vocals
 Jean McClain – backing vocals
 John D'earth – trumpet
 Glenn Wilson – horns
 Branford Marsalis – saxophone

Passing Through
 John Bigham – guitar
 Laura Creamer-Dunville – backing vocals
 Jean McClain – backing vocals
 Jerry Garcia – guitar

The Tide Will Rise
 Pat Metheny – rhythm guitar and guitar solo
 Bonnie Raitt – backing vocals
 Debbie Henry – backing vocals
 Laura Creamer-Dunville – backing vocals
 Jean McClain – backing vocals
 Bona Cheri Williams – backing vocals
 John D'earth – trumpet
 Glenn Wilson – horns
 George Gailes III – horns
 Roy Muth – horns
 Tim Streagle – horns
 George Harple – French horn
 Philip Koslow – French horn
 Adam Lesnick – French horn
 Alan Peterson – French horn

What A Time
 Debbie Henry – backing vocals
 Bona Cheri Williams – backing vocals
 John D'earth – trumpet
 Glenn Wilson – horns
 George Gailes III – horns
 Roy Muth – horns
 Tim Streagle – horns

Pastures of Plenty
 Jerry Garcia – guitar
 John McLaughlin Williams – violin
 Laura Roelofs Park – violin
 Beverly Baker – viola
 William Comita – cello

Production
 Produced by Bruce Hornsby
 Production Coordination – Sharona Sabbag, Shamina Singh and Amy Wenzler.
 Engineered by Wayne Pooley and Steve Strassman
 Additional Engineering – Eddie King
 Mixed by Wayne Pooley (Tracks #1, 3–5, 7, 8 & 10), Keith "KC" Cohen (Track #2) and David Leonard (Tracks #2, 6 & 9).
 Recorded at Bruce Hornsby's House (Williamsburg, VA) and Acme Recording Studios (Mamaroneck, NY).
 Mastered by Bob Ludwig at Gateway Mastering (Portland, ME) and Masterdisk (New York, NY).
 Horn Charts by Bruce Hornsby
 String Quartet Charts by John McLaughlin Williams
 Art Direction and Design – Norman Moore
 Cover and Inside Art – Edward Hopper
 Back Cover Photo – Greg Gorman
 Inside Photo – Carey Wilhelm
 Management – Q Prime
 Guitar Technician for Pat Metheny – Carolyn Chrzan
 Piano Tuning and Service – Leo Schatzel
 Tambourine Technician – Danny Gillen

References 

1993 debut albums
Bruce Hornsby albums
RCA Records albums